Richmond is an inner suburb of Adelaide, South Australia. It is located on Kaurna land in the City of West Torrens.

History

Settlement of the area dates from the late 1830s with land used mainly for farming. Residential and industrial growth took place from the late 19th century into the early 20th century. Expansion continued in the interwar period. The most significant development occurred during the post-war years. The population increased marginally between 2001 and 2006, a result of new dwellings being added to the area.

It was named after the first farm that was established in the area in 1839, owned by Charles Gooch. A subdivision on 1842 of the surrounding area was called "The Village of Richmond".

"Richmond Park", the racehorse stud owned by James Henry Aldridge at the end of Richmond Road is now part of Adelaide Airport.

Community
In 2008, Richmond was listed as Adelaide's most livable suburb within the western suburbs.

Attractions

Shopping and dining
Although much of the suburb is residential, there are small commercial and industrial areas along Richmond Road and South Road.

Parks
The most notable greenspace in Richmond is Richmond Oval, on Milner Road. Currently named City Mazda Stadium, the 16,000 capacity venue has been the home base of the West Adelaide Football Club since 1958.

The Westside Bikeway is a cycling and walking track adjacent to Deacon Avenue, on the alignment of the former Holdfast Bay railway line which closed in 1929.

Richmond was also the home of the now closed Apollo Stadium, Adelaide's major indoor entertainment and sports venue from its opening in 1969 until the opening of the Adelaide Entertainment Centre in 1991 and the Clipsal Powerhouse (now Adelaide Arena) in 1992. Located on Kingston Avenue, the 3,000 seat venue was named for the Apollo Moon landing in 1969. After 1992 the venue was turned into a church before finally closing in 1997.

Transport

Roads
The suburb is serviced by the following main roads:
  South Road, running north–south from the far north of Adelaide to the far south.
  Marion Road, running north–south between Torrensville and Sturt
  Sir Donald Bradman Drive, running east–west between the City of Adelaide and West Beach.

Public transport
Richmond is serviced by public transport run by the Adelaide Metro.

Trains
There is no train stop in Richmond itself. However, the Belair, Seaford and Tonsley railway lines all pass nearby to the east. The closest stations are Mile End and Adelaide Showground.

Trams
 
There were trams in the early days but these were removed in the 1950s and 60s.

Buses
Among others, the suburb is serviced by the following bus routes:

100, 101
Timetable
Routemap

135
Timetable
Route map

167, 168
Timetable
Route map

548
Timetable
Route map

J7
Timetable
Route map

See also
 List of Adelaide suburbs
 List of public transport routes in Adelaide

References

External links
City of West Torrens
Local Government Association of SA – City of West Torrens
2006 ABS Census Data by Location

Suburbs of Adelaide